Juan Ángel Belda Dardiñá (September 7, 1926 – February 22, 2010) was the Catholic bishop of León, Spain.

Ordained a priest on June 29, 1960, he was appointed bishop of the Diocese of Jaca on January 31, 1978 and was ordained bishop on April 1, 1978. On January 28, 1983, he was transferred to the León Diocese resigning on February 9, 1987.

Notes

Bishops of León
1926 births
2010 deaths